The 1998 Temple Owls football team represented Temple University in the 1998 NCAA Division I-A football season; they competed in the Big East Conference. They were led by first–year head coach Bobby Wallace. The Owls played their home games at Veterans Stadium and Franklin Field in Philadelphia, Pennsylvania. They finished with a record of 2 wins and 9 losses (2–9).

Schedule

References

Temple
Temple Owls football seasons
Temple Owls football